Pandolfo I Malatesta (c. 1267 – 6 April 1326), son of Malatesta da Verucchio, was an Italian condottiero and Lord of Rimini from 1317.

In 1304, at the death of Pope Boniface VIII, he captured Pesaro, Fano, Senigallia and Fossombrone, which he lost and recovered in the following years.

In 1317 he became lord of Rimini and head of the Malatesta family at the death of his brother, Malatestino dell'Occhio.

In 1321 he was capitano generale (supreme commander) of the Papal States against the Ghibellines and the Montefeltro of Urbino.

Pandolfo I had two sons - Malatesta II and Galeotto I.

At his death in 1326, there was a struggle for succession between his eldest son, Malatesta II and his nephew Ferrantino (son of Malatestino).  A partition was reached by which Malatesta II succeeded in Pesaro and Ferrantino in Rimini.

References

1267 births
1326 deaths
Pandolfo 1
Malatesta, Pandolfo 1
Lords of Rimini
13th-century condottieri